Marjoke de Bakker is a former Dutch professional footballer who played as a forward for Kooger Football Club and the Netherlands women's national team, earning 61 caps. For 20 years she was the all-time record goal scorer for her country, having scored 29 times. On 21 August 2010 she lost her record when Manon Melis scored twice against Belarus, her 29th and 30th international goals. Melis subsequently lost her record to Vivianne Miedema on 15 June 2019. As of December 2020 de Bakker ranks fifth on the all-time goal scoring list for the Dutch women's football team.

References

1959 births
Living people
Dutch women's footballers
Netherlands women's international footballers
Women's association football forwards